Sellers is a surname. Notable people with the surname include:

 Ann Henderson-Sellers, climatologist
 Bakari Sellers, American politician
 Basil Sellers, Businessman and Philanthropist
 Brad Sellers, American basketball player
 Brian Henderson-Sellers is Professor of Information Systems
 Brian Sellers, English cricketer
 Cleveland Sellers, American educator and veteran civil rights activist
 David F. Sellers, Rear Admiral, White House Aide. A ship was named for him, U.S.S. Sellers.
 Frederic Sellers (1893-1979), English lawyer and judge
 George Escol Sellers (1808-1899), American inventor and businessman
 Isaiah Sellers, American riverboat captain
 Jason Sellers, American country music artist
 Johnny Sellers, American jockey
 Jonathan Sellers, American murder victim
 Larry Sellers, American actor
 Maisie Richardson-Sellers, British actress
 Maud Sellers, British historian and curator
 Mary Sellers, American actress
 Michael Sellers, American football player
 Michael Sellers (actor), British actor, son of Peter Sellers
 Peter Sellers, British actor
 Phil Sellers, American basketball player
 Piers Sellers, British astronaut
 Rex Sellers, New Zealand yachtsman
 Rex Sellers, Australian cricketer
 Ron Sellers, American football player
 Rosabell Laurenti Sellers, Italian-American actress
 T. J. Sellers (born 1911), American journalist and publisher from Virginia
 Tom Sellers (athlete), American wheelchair racer 
 Tom Sellers (journalist) (1922–2006), American Pulitzer prize-winning journalist from Georgia
 Sellers, a scientist and antagonist in the Xenosaga series
 Scott Sellers, American athlete
 Sean Sellers, American murderer
 Sarah Sellers, American athlete
 Victoria Sellers, Actress, designer and model - daughter of Peter Sellers
 William Sellers, American mechanical engineer, inventor, and machine tool builder

See also
 Sellars
 Henderson-Sellers (disambiguation)
 Seller (surname)